Greater Giyani Local Municipality is located in the Mopani District Municipality of Limpopo province, South Africa. The seat of Greater Giyani Local Municipality is Giyani.

Main places
The 2001 census divided the municipality into the following main places:

Politics 
The municipal council consists of sixty-two members elected by mixed-member proportional representation. Thirty-one councillors are elected by first-past-the-post voting in thirty-one wards, while the remaining thirty-one are chosen from party lists so that the total number of party representatives is proportional to the number of votes received. In the election of 3 August 2016 the African National Congress (ANC) won a majority of fifty-one seats on the council.
The following table shows the results of the election.

South African general election, 2014
Results of the National Assembly election of 2014 for Greater Giyani Local Municipality:
ANC  89.2%
EFF  5.3%
DA  3.2%
ACDP  0.5%
COPE  0.4%
AIC  0.4%
APC  0.3%
UDM  0.1%
AGANG SA  0.1%
PAC  0.1%
FF+  0.1%
IFP  0.1%
UCDP  0.0%
AZAPO  0.0% 
WASP  0.0%
NFP  0.0%
UBUNTU  0.0%
PA  0.0%
BRA  0.0%
KISS  0.0%
PAM  0.0%
ICOSA  0.0%
FN  0.0%
MF  0.0%
UNICO  0.0%
FINLA  0.0%
PAL 0.0%
KGM  0.0%
Al Jama-ah  0.0%

References

External links 
 Official homepage

Local municipalities of the Mopani District Municipality